Sotcher Farmhouse, also known as "Three Arches," is a historic home located at Fairless Hills, Falls Township, Bucks County, Pennsylvania. The original house was built about 1712, with substantial additions made about 1760 and 1806.  The original house was likely a one-story, stone structure.  The 1760 section is a two-story, three bay fieldstone structure.  The 1806 addition completely enveloped the 1712 house.  It is a -story, four bay fieldstone structure that incorporates the house's distinctive three arches.

It was added to the National Register of Historic Places in 1977.

References

Houses on the National Register of Historic Places in Pennsylvania
Houses completed in 1806
Houses in Bucks County, Pennsylvania
National Register of Historic Places in Bucks County, Pennsylvania